SEGRO plc (formerly known as Slough Estates Group) is a British property investment and development company.  It develops and invests in property located in the UK and Continental Europe focusing on edge of town flexible business space. The firm switched to Real Estate Investment Trust status when REITs were introduced in the United Kingdom in January 2007. The company is listed on the London Stock Exchange and is a constituent of the FTSE 100 Index.

History

The company was founded by Sir Percival Perry and Sir Noel Mobbs in 1920 as The Slough Trading Company Ltd with the objective of acquiring and developing the site now occupied by the Slough Trading Estate in Slough. In 1926 the Company changed its name to Slough Estates Ltd and in 1931 it expanded north acquiring a site in Birmingham. In the 1980s it expanded rapidly buying Allnatt Properties and Guildhall Properties in 1984, Helmlace in 1985 and Bredero Properties in 1986. In 1999 it acquired Percy Bilton.

In 2004 it sold a number of retail properties to Land Securities in exchange for some industrial properties. It converted to Real estate investment trust status and changed its name from Slough Estates Group to SEGRO in 2007. In 2009 it acquired Brixton plc.

Operations
SEGRO owns commercial and industrial properties in the UK, France, Czech Republic, Poland, Italy, the Netherlands, Belgium, Spain and Germany. The company's portfolio (including joint venture assets) was valued at £16.9 billion at 31 December 2022. In Paris, Segro is developing a 75,000 square metre underground logistics centre close to the city centre for the "Last Mile" of logistics. 

Sites include:
East Midlands Gateway
Segro Park, Kettering
Segro Park Dagenham
Segro Park, Perivale
Segro Park, Rainham
Slough Trading Estate

References

External links
Official site

Further reading
Cassell, Michael Long Lease! The Inside Story of Slough Estates, Pencorp Books 1991

Real estate investment trusts of the United Kingdom
Companies listed on the London Stock Exchange
Real estate companies established in 1920
Companies based in London
1920 establishments in England